Albert Ladenburg (2 July 184215 August 1911) was a German chemist.

Early life and education
Ladenburg was a member of the well-known Jewish  in Mannheim.  He was educated at a Realgymnasium at Mannheim and then, after the age of 15, at the technical school of Karlsruhe, where he studied mathematics and modern languages.  He then proceeded to the University of Heidelberg where he studied chemistry and physics with Robert Bunsen. He also studied physics in Berlin. He got his Ph.D. in Heidelberg.

Academic career 
In 1873, Ladenburg went to Kiel as professor of chemistry and director of the laboratory, remaining there until 1889 when he went to the University of Breslau in the same capacity. He was made an honorary member of the Pharmaceutical Society of Great Britain in 1886 and received the Hanbury Medal for original research in chemistry in 1889.

Ladenburg isolated hyoscine, also known as scopolamine for the first time in 1880. In 1900 Ladenburg founded the Chemische Gesellschaft Breslau, which he managed until 1910. He was also awarded the prestigious Davy Medal in 1905 "for his researches in organic chemistry, especially in connection with the synthesis of natural alkaloids".

Ladenburg also addressed the relation of religion and science in a book he published in 1904, where he dealt with the topics of "Science and spiritual life" and Christianity.

Research 

In Ghent, Ladenburg worked for 6 months with August Kekulé who introduced him to structural theory. They worked on the structure of Benzene. Ladenburg's theory that benzene was a prismatic molecule turned out to be wrong. His proposed structure was eventually realised in 1973 in the molecule prismane.

Ladenburg visited England, and then went on to work for 18 months in  Paris with Charles-Adolphe Wurtz and Charles Friedel on organosilicon compounds and tin compounds. He then returned to Heidelberg to teach.

Family
His son, Rudolf (1882–1952), became an atomic physicist.  Other Son Eric died in boating accident in the early 1900s.

Publications
Entwicklungsgeschichte der Chemie von Lavoisier bis zur Gegenwart (History of the development of chemistry from Lavoisier to the present; 1868)
 Vorträge über die Entwicklungsgeschichte der Chemie in den letzten hundert Jahren. Vieweg, Braunschweig 1869. Digital edition of the University and State Library Düsseldorf.
Handwörterbuch der Chemie (Handy Dictionary of Chemistry; collaborator, 13 vols., 1882–96)
 Religion und Naturwissenschaft: eine Antwort an Professor Ladenburg (1904)
Vortraege ueber die Entwicklungsgeschichte der Chemie von Lavoisier bis zur Gegenwart . Vieweg, Braunschweig 4th ed. 1907 Digital edition of the University and State Library Düsseldorf
Lebenserinnerungen (Reminiscences; 1912)

References

Further reading
Leopold Ladenburg (his father): Stammtafel der Familie Ladenburg, Verlag J. Ph. Walther, Mannheim, 1882.
Albert Ladenburg: Lebenserinnerungen, Trewendt & Granier, Breslau, 1912.

External links
Guide to the Albert Ladenburg Family Collection at the Leo Baeck Institute, New York
 Lectures on the History of Chemistry Since the Time of Lavoisier (1900) by Albert Ladenburg, Tr. Leonard Dobbin, from the 2nd edition of Entwicklungsgeschichte der Chemie von Lavoisier bis zur Gegenwart (1868).

Stammtafel der Familie Ladenburg (1882)

1842 births
1911 deaths
20th-century German chemists
Heidelberg University alumni
Academic staff of the University of Kiel
Academic staff of the University of Breslau
19th-century German chemists
Scientists from Mannheim